The 2026 Asian Games, also known as XX Asiad and Aichi-Nagoya 2026, will be a multi-sport event celebrated in the Aichi Prefecture and its capital Nagoya in Japan from 19 September to 4 October 2026. Nagoya will be the third Japanese city to host the Games, after Tokyo in 1958 and Hiroshima in 1994.

Bidding process
The Olympic Council of Asia (OCA) selected Nagoya to host the Games at their annual general assembly session in Danang, Vietnam, on September 25, 2016. The bid was initially in threat of falling apart after a budget dispute between Aichi Prefecture and its capital Nagoya, but was resolved, allowing the bid to be accepted. The OCA originally planned to choose the 2026 host city in 2018, but brought the planning date forward due to the intensity of the region's sporting calendar, including the next three Olympic Games between 2018 and 2022 (held in Pyeongchang, Tokyo and Beijing).

Development and preparations

Costs
The city of Nagoya received an estimate of roughly ¥85 billion in costs from the Aichi Prefecture government for the event, 30% of which is expected to be covered by sponsorships and other revenue, while the remainder is planned to be split on a 70–30 basis between Nagoya and Aichi Prefecture.

Venues

The games are planned to use existing facilities. It is expected that Paloma Mizuho Stadium will host both the opening and closing ceremonies and athletics, Nippon Gaishi Hall Complex is to be used for both gymnastics and aquatics, the Nagoya Dome is to be used for baseball,  and the Toyota Stadium is to be used for football.
Nagoya Civic General Gymnasium 
 diving, swimming / 3,500 existing
 gymnastics / 5,000 existing
Furuhashi Hironoshin Memorial Hamamatsu Swimming Center – artistic swimming / 2,296 existing
Kasugai City Indoor Pool – water polo (preliminares), modern pentathlon (swimming) / 606 existing
Okazaki Chuo Sogo Park – archery / TBD existing
Mizuho Stadium – athletics, opening and closing ceremonies / 35,000 existing/renovated
Aichi Prefectural Government Office and Nagoya City Hall Area Course – athletics (race walk) / TBD new
Ichinomiya City Municipal Gymnasium – badminton / 2,002 existing
Wing Arena Kariya – 5x5 basketball / 1,576 existing
Nishio Gymnasium – boxing / 1,508 existing
Nagaragawa International Regatta Course – canoeing (sprint), rowing / TBA existing
Yahagigawa Canoe Slalom Course – canoeing (slalom) / TBA existing
Izu Velodrome – cycling (track) / 1,800 existing
Obata Ryokuchi Park – cycling (mountain bike) / TBD temporary
Aichi Prefectural Forest Park – equestrian, modern pentathlon (laser run, equestrian) / TBD existing/temporary
Aichi Sky Expo – fencing / TBD existing
Toyota Stadium – football / 44,400 existing
Nagoya City Minato Soccer Stadium – football / 6,700 existing
Wave Stadium Kariya – football / 2,602 existing
Aichi Country Club Higashiyama Course – golf / TBD existing
Kasugai City Gymnasium – handball, modern pentathlon (fencing) / 2,024 existing
Nagoya City Inae Sports Center – handball / 2,232 existing
Gifu Prefectural Green Stadium – field hockey / 1,630 existing
Aichi Prefectural New Gymnasium – judo, wrestling / TBD new
Mizuho Rugby Stadium – rugby sevens / 11,900 existing
Kaiyoh Yacht Harbor – sailing / TBD existing
Aichi Prefectural Shooting Range – shooting / TBD existing
Sky Hall Toyota – table tennis / 3,470 existing
Toyohashi Gymnasium – taekwondo / 2,000 existing
Higashiyama Park Tennis Center – tennis / 3,000 (center court) existing
Okazaki Chuo Sogo Park Gymnasium – volleyball / 2,620 existing
Park Arena Komaki – volleyball / 1,868 existing
Hekinan Ryokuchi Beach Court – beach volleyball / TBD existing
Nagoya Trade and Industry Center – weightlifting / TBD existing

Football Venues
 Oita Dome - Oita, Oita
 Kanseki Stadium - Utsunomiya, Tochigi
 International Stadium Yokohama - Yokohama, Kanagawa
 Hiroshima Big Arch - Hiroshima, Hiroshima
 Stadium Suita - Suita, Osaka
 Saitama Stadium 2002 - Saitama, Saitama
 Tokyo Stadium - Chōfu, Tokyo
 Fukuda Denshi Arena - Chiba, Chiba

See also
Asian Games celebrated in Japan
1958 Asian Games – Tokyo
1994 Asian Games – Hiroshima

References

Asian Games by year
International sports competitions hosted by Japan
Sports competitions in Aichi Prefecture
Sports competitions in Nagoya
Asian Games 2026
2026 in Japanese sport